In mathematics, an affine root system is a root system of affine-linear functions on a Euclidean space. They are used in the classification of affine Lie algebras and superalgebras, and semisimple p-adic algebraic groups, and correspond to families of Macdonald polynomials. The reduced affine root systems were used by Kac and Moody in their work on Kac–Moody algebras.

Definition
Let E be an affine space and V the vector space of its translations.
Recall that V acts faithfully and transitively on E.

Now suppose we have a scalar product  on V.

Consider the vector space F of affine-linear functions .

The identification let us define a reflection  over E in the following way:

By transposition  acts also on F as

An affine root system is a subset  such that:

The elements of S are called affine roots.
We also ask

This means that for any two compacts  the elements of  such that  are a finite number.

Classification

The affine roots systems A1 =  B1 = B = C1 = C are the same, as are the pairs  B2 = C2, B = C, and A3 = D3

The number of orbits given in the table is the number of orbits of simple roots under the Weyl group.
In the Dynkin diagrams, the non-reduced simple roots α (with 2α a root) are colored green. The first Dynkin diagram in a series sometimes does not follow the same rule as the others.

Irreducible affine root systems by rank

Rank 1: A1, BC1,  (BC1, C1), (C, BC1), (C, C1).
Rank 2: A2,  C2, C, BC2, (BC2, C2),  (C, BC2), (B2, B), (C, C2),  G2, G.
Rank 3: A3, B3, B, C3, C, BC3, (BC3, C3), (C, BC3), (B3, B), (C, C3).
Rank 4: A4, B4, B, C4, C, BC4, (BC4, C4), (C, BC4), (B4, B), (C, C4), D4, F4, F.
Rank 5: A5, B5, B, C5, C, BC5, (BC5, C5), (C, BC5), (B5, B), (C, C5), D5.
Rank 6: A6, B6, B, C6, C, BC6, (BC6, C6), (C, BC6), (B6, B), (C, C6), D6, E6,
Rank 7: A7, B7, B, C7, C, BC7, (BC7, C7), (C, BC7), (B7, B), (C, C7), D7, E7,
Rank 8: A8, B8, B, C8, C, BC8, (BC8, C8), (C, BC8), (B8, B), (C, C8), D8, E8,
Rank n (n>8): An, Bn, B, Cn, C, BCn, (BCn, Cn), (C, BCn), (Bn, B), (C, Cn), Dn.

Applications

 showed that the affine root systems index Macdonald identities
 used affine root systems to study p-adic algebraic groups.
Reduced affine root systems classify affine Kac–Moody algebras, while the non-reduced affine root systems correspond to affine Lie superalgebras.
 showed that affine roots systems index families of Macdonald polynomials.

References

Discrete groups
Lie algebras
Orthogonal polynomials